Fatty acyl-CoA reductase 1 is an enzyme that in humans is encoded by the FAR1 gene.

References

Further reading